Walter is a comic strip in the series The spiffy adventures of McConey (Les formidables aventures de Lapinot in the original French language), by the popular French cartoonist Lewis Trondheim. It was released in 1996 as volume 3 in the series.

An English translation, titled Harum Scarum, was released in 1998.

This is one of the fastest-paced books in the series, and the characters are constantly dragged from one situation to another without getting a chance to catch their breath. This volume is often considered by fans to be one of the funniest and strongest in the series.

Plot
This volume is set in a stock historical setting: Paris in the late 19th century. Although it uses the same main characters (Lapinot, Richard, Titi) and gives them the same type of personality, this story bears no relation to the continuing storyline of the volumes taking place in modern Paris. The plot mixes the mystery, horror, and science fiction genres. A giant monster is seen ravaging the apartment of the missing scientist Prof. Walter, before being caught (and presumably killed) by the authorities. When Richard the journalist wants to take pictures at the morgue for his newspaper, they are told there never was a monster. An investigation follows in which they learn the monster is the result of a scientific experiment gone wrong.

1996 in comics
Works set in the 19th century
Comics set in Paris